Red Wing is a 2013 American Western film directed by Will Wallace and starring Glen Powell, Joelle Carter, Bill Paxton, Luke Perry and Frances Fisher. It is based on the novel François le Champi by George Sand. Terrence Malick served as the executive producer.

Much of the film was shot in Whitewright, Texas.

References

External links

2013 films
2013 Western (genre) films
American Western (genre) films
Films scored by Lorne Balfe
Films shot in Texas
Films based on French novels
Neo-Western films
Films based on works by George Sand
2010s English-language films
Films directed by Will Wallace
2010s American films